Remembrances was released in 2011 in the U.S. on the Words on Music label.   It was a compilation album by The Lucy Show, consisting of rare and previously unreleased material recorded by the band during the mid-1980s.

Track listing
 Leonardo da Vinci (7" version)  –  3.38
Kill the Beast –  3.40
History Part 1 (Norwood version) – 4.22 
Prove It  – 4.44
Come Back to the Living (demo)  – 3.51
 undone (demo)  –  4.30
The Twister (blueprint)  –  3.55
Hours / Remembrances (demo)  –  4.46
Better on the Hard Side (demo) –  6.38
The Lady Lies There –  4.06
The Price of Love (Hoxton Square version)  –  4.45
See it Goes (Parson's Green version)  –  4.50
Lap of the Gods  – 3.23
Waiting for You  – 3.39
Only Moments Away  –  2.37
She's Going Down –  4.07
Where it all Comes Down  –  3.50

Personnel
The Lucy Show consisted of:

Mark Bandola - vocals, guitar, keyboards
Rob Vandeven - vocals, bass guitar
Pete Barraclough - guitars, keyboards
Bryan Hudspeth - drums

The Lucy Show (band) albums
2011 compilation albums